Frøystein Gjesdal (born February 18, 1956) was the rector of the Norwegian School of Economics (NHH) from 2013 to 2017. He succeeded Jan Haaland in 2013. Gjesdal is also a professor at NHH's Department of Accounting, Auditing and Law.

References

1956 births
Living people
Norwegian economists
Academic staff of the Norwegian School of Economics
Norwegian School of Economics alumni
Rectors of the Norwegian School of Economics
Stanford University alumni